Rhigos Rugby Football Club is a Welsh rugby union club based in Rhigos, Aberdare, South Wales.

History
Rhigos RFC were formed by the local cricket team that decided they needed a winter sport to allow them to continue playing when the cricket season ended. A vote was made between members on whether to choose rugby or football, and rugby won by a single vote and the club was created. During the 1937/38 season the club won the Pontypridd and District cup beating Rhydyfelin RFC 3-0. Originally playing on the Gwrangon Field, they moved temporarily to Mount Road, before changing grounds again to Newth's Field.

Club honours
1937/38 Pontypridd and District Cup - champions

Notable past players
  Dai Edwards
  Dai Morris

Notes

Welsh rugby union teams
Rugby clubs established in 1930